Vichelovo is a rural locality (a village) in Yugskoye Rural Settlement, Cherepovetsky District, Vologda Oblast, Russia. The population was 18 as of 2002. There are 9 streets.

Geography 
Vichelovo is located 20 km south of Cherepovets (the district's administrative centre) by road. Voronino is the nearest rural locality.

References 

Rural localities in Cherepovetsky District